Benjamin Box Baxter (13 November 1876 – 6 February 1934) was an Australian rules footballer who played for the Essendon Football Club in the Victorian Football League (VFL).

He was born Benjamin Baxter Box but changed his name to Benjamin Box Baxter when he was fostered by Benjamin Baxter, a magistrate in the Mornington/Hastings shire, following the death of his mother in 1891.

References

External links 
		
Ben Baxter's profile at Australianfootball.com

1876 births
1934 deaths
Australian rules footballers from Melbourne
Essendon Football Club players
People from Frankston, Victoria